The descriptive term white-lipped is part of the common name of a number of different animal species:

Brown white-lipped python or Leiopython, a nonvenomous snake species, L. albertisii, found in New Guinea
Feijo white lipped frog (Hydrolaetare dantasi), a species of frog in the family Leptodactylidae
Galam white-lipped frog (Hylarana galamensis), a species of frog in the family Ranidae
Loreto white-lipped frog (Leptodactylus rhodomystax), a species of frog in the family Leptodactylidae
Mexican white-lipped frog (Leptodactylus fragilis), a species of leptodactylid frog in Texas, Mexico, Central America, Colombia and Venezuela
Northern white-lipped pitviper (Trimeresurus albolabris septentrionalis), a venomous snake  subspecies found in Nepal and India
Wandolleck's white-lipped tree frog (Litoria albolabris), a species of frog in the family Hylidae
White-lipped bamboo viper (Trimeresurus albolabris), a venomous snake species found in Southeast Asia
White-lipped bandicoot or Clara's echymipera (Echymipera clara), a species of marsupial in the family Peramelidae
White-lipped bright-eyed frog (Boophis albilabris), a species of frog in the family Mantellidae
White-lipped chameleon (Furcifer minor) or Minor's chameleon, a species of lizard in the family Chamaeleonidae
White-lipped deer or Thorold's deer (Cervus albirostris), a threatened species of deer found at high altitudes in the eastern Tibetan Plateau
White lipped frog (Chalcorana labialis), a species of "true frog", family Ranidae
White-lipped island pitviper (Trimeresurus albolabris insularis), a venomous snake subspecies found in Indonesia
White-lipped keelback (Amphiesma leucomystax), a nonvenomous snake native to Vietnam
White-lipped mud turtle (Kinosternon leucostomum), a species of mud turtle in the family Kinosternidae
White-lipped peccary (Tayassu pecari), a peccary species found in Central and South America in rainforest, dry forest and chaco scrub
White-lipped python, several species of snake
White-lipped snail (Cepaea hortensis), a medium-sized species of air-breathing land snail, a terrestrial pulmonate gastropod mollusc
White-lipped Snake (Drysdalia coronoides), a small species of elapid snake that is restricted to south-eastern mainland Australia and Tasmania
White-lipped tamarin (Saguinus labiatus), the red-bellied tamarin, a tamarin which lives in the Amazon area of Brazil and Bolivia
White-lipped tree frog (Litoria infrafrenata), the giant tree frog, the world's largest tree frog

See also

White-lipped